Eurypteryx alleni is a moth of the  family Sphingidae. It is found in the Philippines, Sulawesi, Malaysia, Burma, Thailand and probably part of Indonesia.

The length of the forewings is 38–40 mm. It is very similar to Eurypteryx falcata, but darker. The abdomen upperside has no dark spots on tergites four, five and six. The forewing upperside has a dark triangle lacking paler spots along the costa and has no darker area around the black discal spot. The forewing underside has a large triangular patch extending from the base of the wing to the costa. The hindwing upperside has a large black median blotch and the hindwing underside has two dark transverse lines.

Subspecies
Eurypteryx alleni alleni (the Philippines and Sulawesi)
Eurypteryx alleni gigas Haxaire, 2010 (Malaysia, Burma, Thailand and probably part of Indonesia)

References

Eurypteryx
Moths described in 1993